Shirli-Ann Valentine (born 20 June 1974), formerly Shirli-Ann Siddall, is a British former professional tennis player.

Biography
Siddall, who was born in Liverpool, had a promising junior career. In 1990 she won seven out of eight national titles in the under-16 and under-18 divisions.

Based in Dorset, Siddall played professionally in the 1990s. In 1995 she featured in Fed Cup ties for Great Britain against both Poland and the Czech Republic, in Murcia, Spain. She competed regularly in the main draw of the Wimbledon Championships and once at the US Open in 1997, partnering Barbara Schett in the women's doubles.

She made the second round of Wimbledon in both 1992 and 1994. Her most famous match came against Jennifer Capriati in the first round of the 1993 Wimbledon Championships. Playing as a wildcard, Siddall took the first set off the seventh seeded Capriati, but was unable to secure the upset, as the young American came back to win in three. She was most successful in the mixed doubles draw at Wimbledon, with two appearances in the round of 16, both times with Danny Sapsford. The only other occasion she partnered Sapsford at Wimbledon was in 1995 when she had to be carried off the court in a stretcher after fainting from heat exhaustion during their first round match, played in record temperatures.

Siddall retired from professional tennis in 1998. She had been suffering from a persistent back injury.

In 2002, she married Nick Valentine at All Saints Church in Bournemouth. Their wedding took place on the same day as the Wimbledon ladies final.

She lives with her family in the town of Poole in Dorset.

ITF Circuit finals

Singles: 11 (7-4)

Doubles: 23 (14-9)

See also
 List of Great Britain Fed Cup team representatives

References

External links
 
 
 

1974 births
Living people
British female tennis players
English female tennis players
Sportspeople from Liverpool
Sportspeople from Dorset
Tennis people from Merseyside